"Fly by Night" is the title track of Rush's second album. The music was written by bassist Geddy Lee and the lyrics were penned by drummer Neil Peart. Peart wrote this song about his first trip away from home. In 1971, at 18 years old, he left behind his small-town Canadian life and flew to England. Lee sings the lead vocals and on the song's middle eight, his voice is fed through a Leslie speaker.

It was released as a single in May 1975. It marked the first time a single by the band was also released in markets other than the United States or Canada.

Cash Box described it as "a hard-rocking, well-produced cut" that is "very Zeppelinish, with lead guitar and rhythm tracks that could have you evicted." Record World said that a live medley with "In the Mood" "puts the emphasis on fuzz toned guitar and histrionic vocals."

Peart wrote a prologue that is not in the song: "airport scurry / flurry faces / parade of passers-by / people going many places / with a smile or just a sigh / waiting, waiting, pass the time / another cigarette / get in line, gate thirty-nine / the time is not here yet."

In December 1976, the song was released as a single a second time, in a live medley with "In the Mood" from the band's live album All the World's a Stage.

Personnel
Geddy Lee – bass, lead vocals
Alex Lifeson – guitar
Neil Peart – drums

Use in media
 It was used in the Canadian TV series Degrassi High, in the season two episode "Home, Sweet Home".
 The song was used in TV series Supernatural, in the season-one episode "Wendigo".
 In 2012, it was used in an American TV commercial for the Volkswagen Passat.
 It was one of three Rush songs made available to download for play in Rock Band 3 on December 13, 2011, along with a live version of "The Spirit Of Radio" and the single edit of "Caravan".

See also
List of Rush songs

References

1975 songs
Mercury Records singles
Rush (band) songs
Songs written by Geddy Lee
Songs written by Neil Peart
Song recordings produced by Terry Brown (record producer)
Progressive pop songs
1975 singles